Coffee House is a 2010 South Korean television series starring Kang Ji-hwan, Park Si-yeon, Hahm Eun-jung, and Jung Woong-in. It aired on SBS from May 17 to July 27, 2010 on Mondays and Tuesdays at 20:45 for 18 episodes.

The early working title was Page One.

Plot
Lee Jin-soo made it big after writing several thriller novels and establishing himself as a talented novelist. He works for Seo Eun-young, the owner of the biggest publishing company in Korea, and has a long-time friendship with her. Jin-soo has many fans, especially female, and he seems to be the perfect match for any woman... but what no one knows is that he is actually a bit weird and sarcastic, has many strange habits, and holds a dark secret. His secretary, Kang Seung-yeon, has to cope with him and his habits. She begged him for this job to become a pro instead of the below-average girl that she really is. On top of that, there is also the return of Han Ji-won, Eun-young's ex-fiancé, whom she despises. Ji-won tries to win Eun-young back, but she has her eyes set on Jin-soo.

Cast
Kang Ji-hwan as Lee Jin-soo
Park Si-yeon as Seo Eun-young
Hahm Eun-jung as Kang Seung-yeon
Jung Woong-in as Han Ji-won
Park Jae-jung as Kim Dong-wook
Jung Soo-young as Oh Hyun-joo
Jung Ji-ah as Go Yoon-joo
Jin Sung as Park Young-chul
Heo Tae-hee as Dong-min
Ahn Gil-kang as Kang Jin-man (Seung-yeon's father)
Kim Ji-young as Hong Bong-nyeo (Seung-yeon's grandmother)
Kim Min-sang as Kang Seung-chul (Seung-yeon's brother)
Lee Soon-jae as Eun-young's grandfather
Kim Hye-eun as Eun-young's friend
Won Ki-joon as Hyun-seok
 Jung Joon-ho (cameo, ep. 1-2)

Reception 
Coffee House is one of the most watched South Korean dramas on Chinese video streaming platform Youku with over 10,000,000 views and an average of 500,000 views per episode (As of November 2015).

Ratings

Source: TNS Media Korea

Original soundtrack

Awards and nominations

International broadcast

Media release 
The series was made into 2 DVD Box sets and released in Japan on January 19 and February 16, 2011 under Pony Canyon.

References

External links
Coffee House official SBS website 

Seoul Broadcasting System television dramas
Korean-language television shows
2010 South Korean television series debuts
2010 South Korean television series endings
South Korean romantic comedy television series
Television shows written by Song Jae-jung
Works about coffee